Serge Alexis Jaroff ( – 5 October 1985) was the founder, conductor and composer of the Don Cossack Choir Serge Jaroff.

Biography
Jaroff was born  in Makaryev, Kostroma Governorate, Russian Empire. He trained at the Moscow Synod School for Choral Singing. He served as a Don Cossack lieutenant in the Russian Civil War. In 1920, the Don Army were driven into the Crimea by the Red Army. From there they evacuated to a Turkish internment camp near Constantinople, (now Istanbul). In January 1921, Jaroff put together a choir from Russian refugees in the internment camp. Most of the singers who later performed in the Don Cossacks Choir had been members of the Don divisions since the war in 1914. The 3rd Don division in March 1921 was interned on the Greek island of Lemnos.

Then the troops, including the singers, were shipped to Burgas, Bulgaria. The Russian representative asked Jaroff and his choir to join the church. On 23 June 1923, they performed in the cathedral of Sofia and made their formal concert debut in Vienna on 4 July 1923. They subsequently toured America where they were extremely popular and had other international tours in the 1930s, 40s and 50s. The men, dressed as Cossacks, sang a repertory of a cappella Russian sacred and operatic music, army songs and folk songs. Cossack dancing was eventually added to the performance.

Jaroff's last tour was in the 1978–1979 season of the company, but Jaroff continued as the choir leader until 1981.

Personal life
Jaroff married Neonila, and had one son, Aljosha. They lived in Lakewood Township, New Jersey, where Jaroff died in 1985. He became a US citizen after World War II. He is buried at St Mary's R.O. Cemetery in Jackson, New Jersey.

Selected filmography
 The White Devil (1930)
 Moscow-Shanghai (1936)
 A Prussian Love Story (1938)
 Yes, Yes, Love in Tyrol (1955)

References

External links 
 NY Times obituary
 Don Cossack Chorus history
 Michael Minsky–Legend of a Don Cossack
 Discopedia of Serge Jaroff Don Cossack Chorus on Russian-Records.com
 DVD Don Cossack Choir Serge Jaroff brilliantclassics nr. 8892
 Sergei Jaroff and the Don Cossack Choir http://www.pravoslavie.ru/english/88292.htm

American choral conductors
American male conductors (music)
American Cossacks
Don Cossacks
People from Lakewood Township, New Jersey
Russian composers
Russian male composers
White Russian emigrants to the United States
1896 births
1985 deaths
People from Makaryevsky Uyezd (Kostroma Governorate)
Russian choral conductors
Russian male conductors (music)
20th-century American conductors (music)
20th-century American composers
20th-century American male musicians